Gakira is a settlement in Kenya's Central Province.The name 'Gakira' is derived from the Gikuyu word 'Gukira',which means passing(a famous theory indicates that cars never stopped in the Area)

The Area heavily relies on Agriculture with tea and coffee being the main cash crop .

Notable people includes

 Wa-DII
 WILLI
 WANJIRU WA MIRIO 
 NGAFU 
 MUGITHI

References 

Populated places in Central Province (Kenya)